Smile Empty Soul is an American rock band, originally from Santa Clarita, California, United States. It was started in 1998 by Sean Danielsen (vocals and guitar), Ryan Martin (bass), and Derek Gledhill (drums).  Following the departure of Gledhill and Martin from the band in 2005 and 2017, respectively, Danielsen remains the only founding member still active as well as the band's primary songwriter, frontman, and leader.

History

Beginnings (1998–2003)
Smile Empty Soul formed in 1998, while its original members were attending different high schools in the Santa Clarita area.  The band, originally a three-piece group, consisted of vocalist and guitarist Sean Danielsen, bassist Ryan Martin and drummer Derek Gledhill.

After playing numerous hometown gigs, Smile Empty Soul ventured to the Sunset Strip, and later gave a demo to John Parker of Los Angeles indie label, ThroBack Records, which led later on to a record deal with Jason Flom's Lava Records.

Self-titled debut album (2003–2005)
On May 27, 2003, the band released their self-titled debut album Smile Empty Soul.  The album was produced by John Lewis Parker, and mixed by David J. Holman.  Three singles, "Bottom of a Bottle", "Nowhere Kids" and "Silhouettes", were released via the recording.  In March 2005, the album was certified gold with sales in excess of 500,000+.

Anxiety (2005–2006)
In 2005, before the recording of their second album Anxiety was finished, drummer Derek Gledhill was replaced by Flickerstick percussionist Dominic Weir. Their album Anxiety was not released (at that time) due to the band parting ways with Lava Records after the company refused to release their record.

On July 13, 2006, Smile Empty Soul signed with independent label, Bieler Bros. Records.  At this point, drummer Dominic Weir had been replaced by Jake Kilmer, and Mike Booth (ex-Cold) was added as a second guitarist.

Vultures (2006–2009)
On October 24, 2006, the band released Vultures, the official follow-up to their 2003 debut Smile Empty Soul.  The album doesn't feature any songs from the unreleased Anxiety.  The first single released was the song "The Hit".

Vultures debuted at No. 169 on the Billboard 200 album charts with just over 5,000 copies sold.  The band then embarked on a tour with The Exies.

In late April 2007, the band parted ways with Mike Booth, which was a mutual split.  The band has yet to replace him, and has continued on as a 3-piece.

The trio began recording their new record in Greenville, South Carolina on February 1, 2008.

Consciousness and More Anxiety (2009–2012)
Soon after recording for their new album entitled Consciousness was finished, the band returned to the studio to record a few more songs.  Later on, the band confirmed that they had signed with F.O.F./EMI records.  Consciousness was then released in August 2009.

In November 2009, the 2005 album Anxiety was released on iTunes.

On March 9, 2010, More Anxiety, a special edition of Anxiety including a bonus DVD was released.

Smile Empty Soul have released music videos for "We're Through" and "Faker" from their album Consciousness.

In 2009, it was announced that Danielsen formed a new group called World Fire Brigade with Fuel vocalist Brett Scallions, which also consisted of bassist Brad Stewart (ex-Shinedown) and former Candiria drummer Ken Schalk.  The debut studio album, entitled Spreading My Wings, was released in August 2012 through FrostByte Media.

3's (2012–2013)
On March 14, 2012, it was announced that Smile Empty Soul had signed with eOne Music. They released their first album with eOne Music, 3's on May 22, 2012.

In March 2012, "Afterlife", the first single from 3's, was released.

In April 2013 lead singer Sean Danielsen released his solo EP Enjoy the Process.

Later that year, October 1, 2013 was announced as the expected date of release.

Chemicals (2013–2015)

In June 2013 it was announced that Smile Empty Soul formed an imprint label called Two Disciples Entertainment in conjunction with Pavement Entertainment and would release Chemicals in fall of 2013.

On November 3, 2014, Danielsen released his second solo EP entitled Food Chain.

Shapeshifter (2015–2017)
In September 2015, the ensemble also announced through their Facebook page that in early 2016, an EP and DVD was expected.  In November 2015, the band stated that the artwork for the EP is complete.  The work, whose title was announced in January 2016 as Shapeshifter is scheduled for release on 1 April 2016.

Rarities, Oblivion and Sheep (2017–present)
In October 2016, the band stated via their Facebook page that in early 2017, they plan to release a compilation album consisting of 13 rare and unreleased tracks. On 10 December 2016 the compilation album was announced as Rarities as well as artwork and some track names.

In September 2017, the ensemble announced via their Facebook page that Kilmer and Martin would be parting ways with Smile Empty Soul, leaving Danielsen as the only remaining original band member. Mark Young, originally from Hed PE and Victor Ribas, originally from HURT, have joined the band as both touring and recording musicians on bass and drums/percussion/vocals respectively.

In May 2018, Young announced his departure from the ensemble.

On February 7, 2019 it was announced that Smile Empty Soul will be releasing an acoustic EP titled The Acoustic Sessions. Volume 1  In August 2019, Danielsen announced that the ensemble planned to release an EP entitled Sheep .

On February 14, 2020 Sean was teasing new gear on Smile Empty Soul Page with Caption "Interesting things to come........" and Sean revealing Smile Empty Soul will continue as 2 Member Band Only.

On May 18, 2020, it was announced on Facebook along with album art on May 18, 2020 that Acoustic Sessions Vol.2 is going to be recorded .

On July 2, 2020, the band announced that since they are not able to tour (due to the pandemic) they will instead be going into the studio to record an EP titled 2020.

Band members 

Current members
 Sean Danielsen – lead vocals, lead & rhythm guitars  (1998–present)  

Touring Members

 Ty Del Rose – drums  (2018–present) 

Former members
 Ryan Martin – bass guitar  (1998–2017) 
 Jake Kilmer – drums, backing vocals   (2006–2017) 
 Derek Gledhill – drums, backing vocals  (1998–2005) 
 Dominic Weir – drums  (2005–2006) 
 Mike Booth – lead guitars  (2006–2007) 
Mark Young – bass guitar  (2017–2018) 
Victor Ribas – drums, backing vocals (2017–2018)
 Jody Linnell - bass guitar  (2019) 

Former touring members
 Phil Lipscomb – bass guitar  (2014)  
 Preston Rodgers – bass guitar  (2018) 
Chris Berryman - guitar (2004)
 John LeCompt – bass guitar  (2018) 
 Tom Minogue – bass guitar  (2019)

Discography

Studio albums

Compilation albums

EPs

Singles

Other songs 
 "Alone"

Music videos 
 "Bottom of a Bottle"
 "Nowhere Kids"
 "Silhouettes"
 "This Is War"
 "Here's to Another"
 "Jesus Is the Manager at Wal-Mart"
 "Loser"
 "Don't Ever Leave"
 "We're Through"
 "Faker"
 "Afterlife"
 "Not Alike"
 "Wrecking Ball"
 "False Alarm"
 "Chemicals"
 "All In My Head"
 "Not Alike"
 "Stars"
 "My Name"

Contributions 
 "Finding Myself" – Featured on The Punisher: The Album (2004)
 "Who I Am" – Featured on Music from and Inspired by Spider-Man 2 (2004)

Notes

A  "Bottom of a Bottle" did not enter the Billboard Hot 100, but peaked at number 7 on the Bubbling Under Hot 100 Singles chart, which acts as a 25-song extension to the Hot 100.

References

External links
 
 

American post-grunge musical groups
Bieler Bros. Records artists
Musical groups established in 1999
1999 establishments in California
Alternative rock groups from California